Arsen Mekokishvili (12 April 1912 – 9 March 1972) was a Georgian heavyweight freestyle wrestler. He won an Olympic gold medal in 1952 and a world title in 1954.

Mekokishvili took up wrestling following his father, a local champion in chidaoba, and in 1934 won the Georgian chidaoba championship. Later around 1939 he changed to sambo and freestyle wrestling, and won the Soviet titles in sambo in 1940 and 1947–52 and in freestyle wrestling in 1945–46, 1948–53 and 1956. Between 1945 and 1954, he lost only one bout, to Johannes Kotkas. After retiring from competitions Mekokishvili worked as a wrestling coach in Georgia. He died in Moscow as a result of a car accident.

References

External links
 

1912 births
1972 deaths
People from Kakheti
Olympic wrestlers of the Soviet Union
Wrestlers at the 1952 Summer Olympics
Soviet male sport wrestlers
Olympic gold medalists for the Soviet Union
Male sport wrestlers from Georgia (country)
Olympic medalists in wrestling
Medalists at the 1952 Summer Olympics
World Wrestling Champions
Dynamo sports society athletes